Ahaba is a rural community in Oloko, Ikwuano, Local Government Area of Abia State, Nigeria. Isiala Ahaba and Ahaba Ukwu are the autonomous communities of Ahaba.

See also
Nchara

References

Populated places in Abia State